FC du Plessis (born ) is a South African rugby union player for the  in the Currie Cup. His regular position is fly-half or centre.

Du Plessis was named in the  squad for the 2021 Currie Cup Premier Division. He had previously represented  in 4 appearances during the 2020–21 Top 14 season.

References

South African rugby union players
2001 births
Living people
Rugby union fly-halves
Rugby union centres
Blue Bulls players
RC Toulonnais players
Bulls (rugby union) players
Mie Honda Heat players